The 2019 European Darts Matchplay was the eleventh of thirteen PDC European Tour events on the 2019 PDC Pro Tour. The tournament took place at the Maimarkthalle, Mannheim, Germany, from 6–8 September 2019. It featured a field of 48 players and £140,000 in prize money, with £25,000 going to the winner.

Michael van Gerwen was the defending champion after defeating William O'Connor 8–2 in the previous year's final. Van Gerwen reached a third European Tour final in five events, but lost in his third successive final appearance as Joe Cullen won his first stage title with an 8–5 success.

Prize money
This is how the prize money is divided:

 Seeded players who lose in the second round do not receive this prize money on any Orders of Merit.

Qualification and format
The top 16 entrants from the PDC ProTour Order of Merit on 25 June will automatically qualify for the event and will be seeded in the second round.

The remaining 32 places will go to players from six qualifying events – 18 from the UK Tour Card Holder Qualifier (held on 2 August), six from the European Tour Card Holder Qualifier (held on 2 August), two from the West & South European Associate Member Qualifier (held on 5 September), four from the Host Nation Qualifier (held on 5 September), one from the Nordic & Baltic Qualifier (held on 23 August), and one from the East European Qualifier (held on 24 August).

From 2019, the Host Nation, Nordic & Baltic and East European Qualifiers will only be available to non-Tour Card holders. Any Tour Card holders from the applicable regions will have to play the main European Qualifier.

The following players will take part in the tournament:

Top 16
  Michael van Gerwen (runner-up)
  Ian White (third round)
  Gerwyn Price (third round)
  Dave Chisnall (semi-finals)
  Daryl Gurney (third round)
  Peter Wright (second round)
  James Wade (semi-finals)
  Adrian Lewis (third round)
  Krzysztof Ratajski (quarter-finals)
  Nathan Aspinall (second round)
  Joe Cullen (champion)
  Rob Cross (quarter-finals)
  Ricky Evans (third round)
  Glen Durrant (quarter-finals)
  Jonny Clayton (quarter-finals)
  Mensur Suljović (third round)

UK Qualifier
  Michael Smith (second round)
  Simon Stevenson (second round)
  Simon Whitlock (first round)
  Mark McGeeney (first round)
  Jamie Hughes (second round)
  Ryan Meikle (second round)
  Scott Taylor (second round)
  John Henderson (second round)
  Keegan Brown (second round)
  Ryan Joyce (first round)
  Steve Lennon (first round)
  Robert Thornton (first round)
  Bradley Brooks (second round)
  Ross Smith (first round)
  William O'Connor (third round)
  Brett Claydon (first round)
  Matthew Edgar (first round)
  Wayne Jones (third round)

European Qualifier
  Dirk van Duijvenbode (second round)
  Jeffrey de Zwaan (first round)
  Maik Kuivenhoven (first round)
  Max Hopp (first round)
  Kim Huybrechts (second round)
  Gabriel Clemens (second round)

West/South European Qualifier
  Wesley Plaisier (first round)
  Cody Harris (second round)

Host Nation Qualifier
  Marvin Wehder (second round)
  Florian Hempel (first round)
  Steffen Siepmann (first round)
  Karsten Koch (second round)

Nordic & Baltic Qualifier
  Dennis Nilsson (first round)

East European Qualifier
  Krzysztof Kciuk (first round)

Draw

References

2019 PDC Pro Tour
2019 PDC European Tour
2019 in German sport
September 2019 sports events in Germany